Avathara Purushan is a 1996 Indian Tamil-language drama film directed by Pandiyan Arivali. The film stars Ranjith, Anand and Sivaranjani, with Goundamani, Senthil, Vivek, Veerapandiyan, Thalaivasal Vijay, Kavitha and Karikalan playing supporting roles. It was released on 28 June 1996.

Plot

Anand and Vaishali are college students. Anand falls in love with Vaishali at first sight. When Anand reveals her his love, Vaishali rejects it and she ridicules him. Since that day, he follows her everywhere to tease her. She then complains to the police. Soon, Vaishali becomes pregnant and hides the father's name to her parents. Feeling ashamed about her pregnancy, her family moves to Ooty.

Vaishali finally reveals to her parents that she was raped by a stranger. After giving birth, she drops the baby in front of the rapist's house. Anand didn't understand anything. He was also a student and was the other Anand's worst enemy. Anand was arrested mistakenly and beaten by the police for teasing Vaishali.

Anand takes care of the baby. Anand thinks that the rapist is Anand. Both Anands fight among themselves but they turn out to be innocents in this affair. In the meantime, Vaishali befriends Raja. What transpires later forms the crux of the story.

Cast

Ranjith as Anand
Anand as Anand
Sivaranjani as Vaishali
Goundamani as 'pickpocket' Periyasamy
Senthil
Vivek as Adaikalam
Veerapandiyan as Raja
Thalaivasal Vijay as Vaishali's father
Kavitha as Vaishali's mother
Ganeshkar
Dhamu
Bonda Mani
Mayilsamy
Idichapuli Selvaraj
Kovai Senthil
Jayamani as Karuppu
Karuppu Subbiah
Tirupur Ramasamy
Chelladurai
Joker Thulasi
K. B. Kumar
Mathi
Master Vijay
Baby Raani
Yogeshwari
Susila
Nirmala
Eashwari
Anupama
Indhu

Soundtrack

The film score and the soundtrack were composed by Sirpy. The soundtrack, released in 1996, features 5 tracks with lyrics written by the Vaali.

References

1996 films
1990s Tamil-language films
Indian drama films
Films scored by Sirpy
1996 drama films